The San Jose Barracuda are a professional ice hockey team in the American Hockey League (AHL) that began play in the 2015–16 season. The team play at Tech CU Arena beginning with the 2022-23 season. 

The Barracuda is a relocation of the former Worcester Sharks AHL franchise; it joined several other AHL franchises to form the AHL's Pacific Division in 2015.

History
On January 29, 2015, the San Jose Sharks announced that they would be moving their AHL affiliate, the Worcester Sharks, to San Jose, California, as one of five charter members of the AHL's new Pacific Division. The team played at the SAP Center at San Jose, being one of two of the current AHL teams to share a home arena with its parent club (along with the Manitoba Moose sharing Bell MTS Place with their parent Winnipeg Jets).

On April 1, 2015, the Silicon Valley Business Journal reported that the Sharks had signed a multi-year presenting sponsorship with Barracuda Networks to be the AHL team's presenting sponsor; the team name would be the San Jose Barracuda and the reported team logo would feature the corporate logo in the background. Neither the Sharks nor Barracuda would comment, however, they stated that an official announcement would come later in the week. The name and logo were confirmed the next day in a joint press release. The team retained longtime AHL head coach Roy Sommer with the relocation.

Friday October 9, 2015 marked the first official game in Barracuda history. They took on the Rockford IceHogs at home, coming up on the losing end of a 4–2 score. Micheal Haley scored the first ever franchise goal while on a power play in the first period. The Barracuda picked up the first win in franchise history while visiting the Stockton Heat on October 15, 2015 by a score of 4–1.

On February 10, 2016, head coach Roy Sommer broke the record for most wins as an AHL coach, picking up his 637th win against the Ontario Reign by the score of 4–2.

The Barracuda finished the season 31–26–8–3. Its .527 winning percentage meant that it was matched up against the Ontario Reign during the Pacific Division semifinals. After splitting the first two games of the best-of-five series, the Barracuda came out on the losing end of game three by a 3–1 score, and also lost game four by a score of 4–1 to end their season. Bryan Lerg and Nikolay Goldobin led the team in goals with 21, while Ryan Carpenter had a team high 55 points. Goaltender Aaron Dell played a team high 40 games in net for the Barracuda, while winning 17 of them. The team's average attendance of 4,412 placed them 24th of 30 in the AHL.

The Barracuda's 2016–17 season would be more successful than its first season, winning 14 consecutive games from January 15 to March 1 and winning the Pacific Division and Western Conference. Goaltender Troy Grosenick won the "Baz" Bastien Award as the AHL's outstanding goaltender. The Barracuda made it to the Western Conference finals during the 2017 Calder Cup playoffs before being eliminated by the Grand Rapids Griffins four-games-to-one.

The Barracuda were the final team to make the playoffs in 2018, winning multiple games in a row. They were eliminated in the first round by the Tucson Roadrunners.

In 2018–19, the Barracuda led the AHL's Pacific Division for most of the first half of the season before the Bakersfield Condors went on a 17-game winning streak, and finished in second place in the division, four points behind the Condors. The Barracuda lost in the first round of the 2019 Calder Cup playoffs three games to one against the San Diego Gulls.

During the 2019–20 season, head coach Sommer was called up to the Sharks as an assistant after over 21 seasons as the Sharks' AHL affiliate head coach. The Sharks named Barracuda assistants Jimmy Bonneau and Michael Chiasson as co-coaches for Sommer's replacements. In January 2020, the city of San Jose approved of a proposed 4,200-seat arena to be built at the Sharks' Solar4America Ice complex that would be utilized by the Barracuda for home games and expected to be completed by 2022. The 2019–20 season then ended prematurely due to the restrictions caused by the COVID-19 pandemic.

Sommer returned to the Barracuda as head coach on September 22, 2020. The start of the 2020–21 season was postponed during the pandemic and Santa Clara County eventually barred all indoor and contact sporting events until at least February 2021. The AHL season schedule was announced to begin on February 5, causing the Barracuda to play its opening home games in Tucson against the Tucson Roadrunners before embarking on a seven-game road trip, as well as scheduling some games at Solar4America Ice due to the Sharks's home schedule at SAP Center.

On May 18, 2022, the Barracuda named development coach and former team captain John McCarthy as the second head coach in franchise history. Sommer moved to an advisory position.

Beginning the 2022-23 AHL season, the Barracuda will begin play at the TechCU Arena.

Season-by-season records

Mascot
Frenzy the Barracuda is the mascot for the San Jose Barracuda.

Players

Current roster
Updated March 19, 2023.

|}

Team captains 

 Bryan Lerg, 2015–16
 John McCarthy, 2016–20
 Jaycob Megna, 2021–22
 Andrew Agozzino, 2022–present

References

External links
 San Jose Barracuda Official Website

 
1
Ice hockey teams in California
Sports in San Jose, California
Ice hockey clubs established in 2015
2015 establishments in California